Hugh Reilly (October 30, 1915 – July 17, 1998) was an American actor who performed on the Broadway stage, in films, and on television.  He is best remembered for co-starring from 1958 to 1964 as the father, Paul Martin, in the CBS television series, Lassie.

Early years and career
His Broadway credits included Fair Game (1957), Dear Charles (1954), Never Say Never (1951), Second Threshold (1950), and The Curious Savage (1950).

Reilly worked many early television anthology series. His first screen appearance was in the 1949 episode "The Flying Gerardos" of Kraft Television Theatre. He subsequently was cast in Robert Montgomery Presents (1950-1955), The Ford Television Theatre (1951), Broadway Television Theatre (1953), Armstrong Circle Theatre (1953-1957), Appointment with Adventure (twice in 1955), The Alcoa Hour (1956), Crossroads (as host of the 1956 episode "Through the Window"), The United States Steel Hour (1958).

He portrayed David Naughton, the title character's husband, in the American television series Claudia (1952). His film appearances include Johnny Stool Pigeon (1949), and Bright Victory (1951).

Final years
Reilly continued to work sporadically in television through the 1970s. He was cast against type on CBS's The Edge of Night soap opera where he played Dr. Simon Jessup, a fake spiritualist/attempted murderer from December 1971 to May 1973. He appeared in one episode each on ABC's The F.B.I. in 1967 and on NBC's Father Murphy in 1982.

Death
Hugh Reilly died on July 17, 1998, in Burbank, California, of emphysema. He had three sons: Joshua, Ethan and David Reilly.

Filmography

References

External links
 
 
 

1915 births
1998 deaths
American male stage actors
American male television actors
American male soap opera actors
American male film actors
Male actors from Newark, New Jersey
Male actors from Greater Los Angeles
People from Burbank, California
United States Army Air Forces soldiers
United States Army personnel of World War II
Deaths from emphysema
Burials at Forest Lawn Memorial Park (Hollywood Hills)
20th-century American male actors